Tillandsia ferreyrae is a species of flowering plant in the genus Tillandsia, endemic to Peru.

Cultivars
 Tillandsia 'Rechoncho'
 Tillandsia 'Royal Sceptre'

References

ferreyrae
Endemic flora of Peru
Plants described in 1863